Juan Simón's Daughter (Spanish:La hija de Juan Simón) is a 1957 Spanish musical drama film directed by Gonzalo Delgrás and starring Antonio Molina, María Cuadra and Mario Berriatúa. It is based on the play by Nemesio M. Sobrevila. A 1935 film of the same title had previously been made.

Cast
 Antonio Molina as Antonio Lucena  
 María Cuadra as Carmen García Luque 'Carmela'  
 Mario Berriatúa as Alfonso Guzmán  
 Manuel de Juan as Padre de Carmela  
 Maruja García Alonso 
 Celia Condado 
 Dolores Quesada 
 Carmen Sanz 
 Lis Rogi as Francesa 
 Celia Foster
 Juana Cáceres as Madre de Carmela 
 Miguel del Castillo as Marqués  
 Luis Ramirez
 Rufino Inglés as Director sesión fotográfica  
 Luis Domínguez Luna
 José Fermán
 María Jesús García 
 Juanita Muñiz 
 Carmen Pastor 
 Lidya Batalla
 José Vilar
 José Morales
 José Izquierdo Monje 
 Calero Parra 
 Antonio Molino Rojo
 Carmen Pérez Gallo
 Antonio Martínez as Productor con botella de champán (as Antonio Martinez)  
 Jesús Narro
 María Avelenda 
 Lolita Márquez
 Fernando Somoza 
 José Peromingo
 Antonio Moreno 
 Antonio Martín 
 José Manuel Ramirez
 Amalia Sánchez Ariño
 Francisco Salas
 Gonzalo Delgrás as Director de la película

References

Bibliography 
  Eva Woods Peiró. White Gypsies: Race and Stardom in Spanish Musical Films. U of Minnesota Press, 2012.

External links 
 

1950s musical drama films
Spanish musical drama films
1957 films
1950s Spanish-language films
Films directed by Gonzalo Delgrás
Films produced by Ricardo Sanz
1957 drama films
1950s Spanish films